= DigitalMania =

Tunisian video game developer

DigitalMania Studio
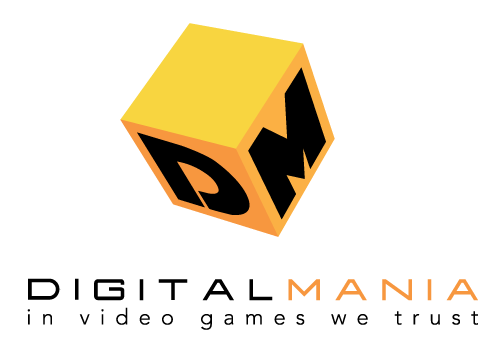
- Industry: Video Games
- Founded: 2012
- Headquarters: Tunis, Tunisia
- Key people: Walid Sultan Midani (CEO)
- Number of employees: 20
- Website: www.digitalmaniastudio.com

DigitalMania is the first independent video game developer studio in Tunisia. Founded in 2012 by Walid Sultan Midani, DigitalMania develops multiplatform games for Facebook, iOS, and Android.

== Games ==
- Funky Shooter (2015)
- Beat The Beats (2015)
